Nathalia Holt, Ph.D. (born December 13, 1980) is an American author of non-fiction. Her works include Cured, Rise of the Rocket Girls and The Queens of Animation.

Life
Holt is from New York, NY. She studied at University of Southern California, Tulane University, and Harvard University. Her career includes work at the Phillip T. and Susan M. Ragon Institute.

Her research as a science writer has included work at the JPL archives, the Caltech Library, and the Schlesinger Library on the History of Women in America at Harvard. Her work appears in The Atlantic, The New York Times, PBS, Popular Science, and NPR.

Her book Cured: The People Who Defeated HIV (2015) discusses the scientific complexities of two patients who have been exceptions to the usual procession of AIDS. Each has experienced a "functional cure", raising hopes that researchers may someday find a "safe and reliable way" to protect patients against HIV. Two types of genetic mutation - the “exposed uninfected” and the “elite controllers,” - appear to be able to resist the disease. Holt describes the science involved, to the extent that it is currently understood.

Holt's book Rise of the Rocket Girls: The Women Who Propelled Us, from Missiles to the Moon to Mars (2016) chronicles the lives of women computers at NASA's Jet Propulsion Laboratory (JPL) in California. It also puts them into the context of milestones in both scientific and more general history. Supervisors Macie Roberts and later Helen Ling employed women as computers at a time when few scientific careers were open to women.

Holt lives in Monterey, California.

Works

See also
Timothy Ray Brown
Susan G. Finley
Mary Blair
Retta Scott

References

External links
Official website

Living people
American microbiologists
People from Boston
HIV/AIDS researchers
1980 births
American non-fiction writers